Laura Neboli (born 14 March 1988) is an Italian football defender who last played for MSV Duisburg of the German Bundesliga. She previously played in Serie A for CF Bardolino, ASD Reggiana and UPC Tavagnacco.

As a member of the Italy women's national football team, she took part in the 2009 and 2013 UEFA Women's Championships.

International career
Neboli made her senior debut for the Italy women's national football team in March 2008, in a 4–2 Algarve Cup defeat by Norway.

At UEFA Women's Euro 2009 in Finland, Neboli was an unused substitute in all four games as the Italians reached the quarter-finals. National coach Antonio Cabrini named Neboli in his selection for UEFA Women's Euro 2013 in Sweden.

Titles
 1 Italian League (2005)
1 Italian Cup with Reggiana ( 2010 )

References

External links

 

1988 births
Living people
Italian women's footballers
Italy women's international footballers
FCR 2001 Duisburg players
MSV Duisburg (women) players
Serie A (women's football) players
A.S.D. AGSM Verona F.C. players
Women's association football defenders
U.P.C. Tavagnacco players
Expatriate women's footballers in Germany
Italian expatriate women's footballers
Italian expatriate sportspeople in Germany
Footballers from Brescia
Frauen-Bundesliga players
A.S.D. Reggiana Calcio Femminile players